Benzo[k]fluoranthene is an organic compound with the chemical formula C20H12. Classified as a polycyclic aromatic hydrocarbon (PAH), it forms pale yellow needles or crystals, and is poorly soluble in most solvents. Impure samples can appear off white.  Closely related isomeric compounds include benzo(a)fluoranthene,  benzo(b)fluoranthene,  benzo(e)fluoranthene, and  benzo(j)fluoranthene.

References

Polycyclic aromatic hydrocarbons
IARC Group 2B carcinogens
PBT substances